Tarri is a 2023 Indian Marathi-language action drama film written and directed by Mahesh Ravsaheb Kale. Produced by On Your Spot Productions and Phantasmagoria Films. The film stars Lalit Prabhakar, Gauri Nalawade, Shashank Shende in lead roles. It was theatrically released on 17 February 2023.

Cast 

 Lalit Prabhakar 
 Gauri Nalawade 
 Shashank Shende
 Yogesh Dimbale
 Anil Nagarkar 
 Shashank Darne 
 Sneha Joshi 
 Rajesh Nanaware

Release

Theatrical 
The film was theatrically released on 17 February 2023.

References

External links 

 

2023 films
Indian action films
Indian action drama films